Game world or Game(s) World may refer to:

 Fictional universe, a self-consistent setting with events, and often other elements, that differ from the real world
 Fantasy world, an author-conceived world created in fictional media, such as literature, film or games
 Virtual world, a large-scale, interactive computer-simulated environment
 Game World, a stallion who won the World Grand Championship in the Tennessee Walking Horse National Celebration in 2011
 Games World, a British entertainment programme